Pope Gregory XIV (11 February 1535 – 16 October 1591), born Niccolò Sfondrato or Sfondrati, was head of the Catholic Church and ruler of the Papal States from 5 December 1590 to his death in October 1591.

Early career 
Niccolò Sfondrati was born at Somma Lombardo, then part of the Duchy of Milan, in the highest stratum of Milanese society. His mother, of the house of Visconti, died in childbirth. His father Francesco Sfondrati, a senator of the ancient comune of Milan, was created cardinal-priest by Pope Paul III in 1544.

In his youth he was known for his modest lifestyle and stringent piety. He studied law at Perugia and Padua, was ordained a priest and swiftly appointed Bishop of Cremona, in 1560, in time to participate in the sessions of the Council of Trent from 1561 to 1563. Pope Gregory XIII made him a Cardinal-Priest of Santa Cecilia in Trastevere on 12 December 1583. Sfondrati was a close follower of Carlo Cardinal Borromeo, and when the cardinal died, he celebrated the Requiem Mass for Borromeo on 7 November 1584. Sfondrati was an intimate friend and a great admirer of Philip Neri, an Italian priest who died in 1595 and was canonised in 1622.

Papal election 

After the death of Pope Urban VII on 27 September 1590, the Spanish ambassador Olivares presented the conclave a list of the seven cardinals who would be acceptable to his master Philip II of Spain. On 5 December 1590, after two months of deadlock, Sfondrati, one of Philip II's seven candidates but who had not aspired to the office, was elected pope. Alessandro Cardinal Montalto came to Sfondrati's cell to inform him that the Sacred College had agreed on his election and found him kneeling in prayer before a crucifix.

On the day after he was elected Pope, Gregory XIV burst into tears and said to the cardinals: "God forgive you! What have you done?" In his bull of 21 March 1591, Cogit nos, he forbade under pain of excommunication all betting concerning the election of a Pope, the duration of a pontificate, or the creation of new cardinals.

Papacy 

Gregory XIV's brief pontificate was marked by vigorous intervention in favour of the Catholic party in the French Wars of Religion. Instigated by the king of Spain and the duke of Mayenne, he excommunicated Henry IV of France on 1 March 1591, reiterating the 1585 declaration of Pope Sixtus V that as a heretic (Protestant) Henry was ineligible to succeed to the throne of Catholic France and ordered the clergy, nobles, judicial functionaries, and the Third Estate of France to renounce him.

Gregory XIV levied an army for the invasion of France, and dispatched his nephew Ercole Sfondrati to France at its head. He also sent a monthly subsidy of 15,000 scudi to Paris to reinforce the Catholic League. By coming down solidly on the side of Spanish interests, in part because Gregory XIV was elected due to the influence of the Spanish cardinals, the recent papal policy of trying to maintain a balance between Spain and France was abandoned.

Gregory XIV created five cardinals in two consistories, among whom was his nephew Paolo Emilio Sfondrati, his Secretary of State. He attempted to convince Philip Neri, a long-time friend, to accept the post of Cardinal, but Neri refused, saying that there were many more deserving of the honour than him.

In a decree dated 18 April 1591 (Bulla Cum Sicuti), Gregory XIV ordered reparations to be made by Catholics in the Philippines to the natives, who had been forced into slavery by Europeans, and he commanded under pain of excommunication of the owners that all native slaves in the islands be set free.

The biographers mention that Pope Gregory XIV had a nervous tendency to laughter, which occasionally became irresistible and even manifested itself at his coronation. Gregory XIV, who was in poor health before his election to the papacy, died due to a large gallstone and was succeeded by Innocent IX.

See also 
 Cardinals created by Gregory XIV

References

External links 

 
 Biography on St. Michael's Call Papal Library
 Defending the Faith website: Gregory XIV
 

 
Popes
Italian popes
University of Perugia alumni
Participants in the Council of Trent
People from Somma Lombardo
1535 births
1591 deaths
16th-century popes
Burials at St. Peter's Basilica